"The Terror of Blue John Gap" is a short story written by Sir Arthur Conan Doyle. It was first published in Strand Magazine in 1910. It is the subject of an ongoing study, The Terror of Blue John Gap Project, by Margie Deck and Nancy Holder.

The story comprises the adventures of a British doctor, recovering from  tuberculosis, who goes to stay at a Derbyshire farm looking for rest and relaxation, becomes entrapped in a series of sinister events, and is forced to uncover the mysteries surrounding "Blue John Gap" and the "Terror" that lurks within it.

Plot summary
Dr James Hardcastle, who is convalescing in a Derbyshire farm, discovers Blue John Gap, a Roman Derbyshire Blue John mine. He begins to investigate the mine and the extensive underground formations to which it connects, despite the warnings of a local farmer who claims it contains a monster that has been stealing his sheep.

Hardcastle hears a large creature moving in the cave, and uncovers more evidence that it has been preying on local sheep. He determines to face it alone, as the colleagues whom he asked for help dismissed his claims as madness. He manages to wound the creature, and is badly hurt himself doing so.

The local people, who believe Hardcastle, seal the mine after the creature has returned to it. Hardcastle dies from trauma, leaving a description of his experience to try to convince his London colleagues.

Themes 

One of the central themes of The Terror of Blue John Gap is Hardcastle's difficulty in getting the world to believe him. This theme is mirrored with Conan Doyle's other character, Professor Challenger's struggles to get the world to believe the truth of his adventures in The Lost World (the creature in "The Terror of Blue John Gap" is a prehistoric survivor like the creatures in The Lost World).

It also echoes Conan Doyle's career as a campaigner for various causes such as the atrocities in the Congo and spiritualism where he was met with denial in the former case and doubt in the latter. In that respect Philip Gooden theorises that Dr James Hardcastle, and Professor Challenger, who boldly prove the scientific community wrong, may have been a wish fulfillment on Doyle's part.

Characters 
 Dr James Hardcastle The hero of the story. A doctor who, while recovering from tuberculosis, discovers the mystery of Blue John Gap and bravely resolves to solve it alone when the world scorns him. While he emerged triumphant the ordeal left him a broken man. He died on 4 February 1908 in South Kensington.
 Armitage A young sheep farmer. He was the one who first introduced Dr Hardcastle to the sinister goings on around Blue John Gap. He later vanishes without a trace and is presumed to have been killed by the "Terror".
 The Miss Allertons Two elderly sister spinsters. They run the farm and inn where Hardcastle is sent to recover from his illness. They are described as quaint with hearts of gold.
 Dr Mark Johnson A friend of Professor Saunderson. Hardcastle turns to him for help and he promptly sent Hardcastle to Picton's asylum as a result.
 Professor Saunderson Hardcastle's Doctor. He was the one who recommended Miss Allerton's farm as a place for Hardcastle to recover and apparently grew up there himself.
 Seaton A friend of Hardcastle. Hardcastle addressed his notes of the events to him. Enquiry apparently failed to identify who Seaton was and his identity, and even existence, remained a mystery.

Locations 
 Miss Allerton's farm the place in Derbyshire where Hardcastle was sent  to recover from illness. Professor Saunderson was "not above scaring crows in those very fields."
 Blue John Gap a mine, one of only two in the world where the beautiful and rare Blue John mineral is found. The Romans created the mine and, in the process, their shaft intersected into the great water-worn caves of the underworld.
 Underworld Hardcastle discovers that the limestone hills are hollow; "Strike it with some gigantic hammer it would boom like a drum." Inside, he theorised, is a huge subterranean sea. The evaporation from this sea supports a forest and animal life, which entered the caves from the surface and became trapped when the caves were cut off. Since then they have evolved into the creature Hardcastle encountered.

See also
Blue John

Notes

References

The Terror of Blue John Gap at Locus Magazine's Index to Science Fiction

External links

Review
Online text of the story
 

1910 short stories
Short stories by Arthur Conan Doyle
Blue John (mineral)
Derbyshire in fiction